In particle physics, the Glashow resonance is the resonant formation of the W boson in antineutrino-electron collisions:  +  → .

History

The resonance was proposed by Sheldon Glashow in 1959.

Theory

The threshold antineutrino energy for this process (for the electron at rest in the laboratory frame) is given by the formula

(here is, for completeness, included also the antineutrino mass, which vanishes in the Standard model), which gives 6.3 PeV, a huge energy for a fundamental particle. This process is considered for the detection and studies of high-energy cosmic neutrinos at the IceCube experiment, at the ANTARES neutrino telescope, and at the  KM3NeT neutrino telescope.

Detection
A report observing the resonance at 2.3σ level has been made by the IceCube experiment in March 2021.

References

Electroweak theory
Neutrino astronomy
Hypothetical processes